St. John the Evangelist is a parish of the Anglican Diocese of Montreal in the Anglican Church of Canada in Montreal, Quebec, Canada, founded by Father Edmund Wood in 1861; its church is well known in Montreal as the "Red Roof Church", which was also the headquarters of St. Michael's Mission until 2022. Its orientation is Anglo-Catholic, and it is the only Anglican locale in Montreal to practise this tradition, known as High Church. Solemn High Mass is celebrated on Sundays and feast days and Solemn Evensong and Benediction several Sundays a year. Mass is said daily, in French on Tuesdays. The parish of Saint-Benoît-de-Nursie, a French-language congregation of the Orthodox Church in America, worships in the Chapel of Our Lady of Walsingham in the church's crypt.

The church is part of the Conseil du Patrimoine religieux du Québec.

The building has starred alongside Nick Nolte in the film Affliction, and in the Quebec science-fiction television series Dans une galaxie près de chez vous. The building is located in downtown Montreal, nested within Université du Québec à Montréal buildings, and Quartier des Spectacles, at 137 President Kennedy Avenue.

Notable people
Brooke Claxton, politician
Sir Edward Clouston, banker
Sir George Alexander Drummond, senator
Heward Grafftey, politician
Prudence Heward, artist
John Hamilton, senator
Sir William Osler, physician
Frederick George Scott, poet and curate
Sir Campbell Stuart, newspaper magnate
Sir William Fenwick Williams, Crimean War general

See also
 List of Anglo-Catholic Churches

References

"Centenary Book of the Parish of St. John the Evangelist, Montreal, 1861-1961" by St. John the Evangelist Anglican Church, Montreal, Quebec Call Number  365.2.J.03.0

External links
St. John the Evangelist official site
Quartier des Spectacles article

John the Evangelist
John the Evangelist (Montreal)
Landmarks in Montreal
Gothic Revival architecture in Montreal
John the Evangelist (Montreal)
Downtown Montreal
William Tutin Thomas buildings
Churches completed in 1878
19th-century Anglican church buildings in Canada
Gothic Revival church buildings in Canada